Eva Schorr (28 September 1927 – 20 January 2016) was a German painter and composer.

Biography
Eva Weiler was born in Crailsheim, Württemberg. Her father was a music and art teacher and gave her lessons in both. At the age of eight she began composing, and at the age of 15 won prizes for composition and organ. She studied music in Stuttgart with Johann Nepomuk David and Anton Nowakowski. She also studied with Olivier Messiaen in Darmstadt.

She married Dieter Schorr, music editor of the Stuttgarter Nachrichten and had two sons and a daughter.  She died at the age of 88 in 2016.

Honors and awards
1961 GEDOK Prize
Prize Composition Competition in Mannheim
Prizes for 4 International Competitions in Buenos Aires

Works
Schorr has composed chamber music, orchestral works, choral works and music for the stage and film.
Septuarchie violin concerto
Ritornell (Meditation) for violin and organ
Pas de Trois
In der Welt ihr Angst Habte, cantata with violin and organFantasie, Choral und Fuge for organ and oboeWir sind ein Teil der Erde choralKyrie choralPsalm 98 for organ

Her work has been recorded and issued on CD including:Initialen F-G-H-S''Kammerensemble Niggemann, Hans-Ulrich Niggemann (soprano flute), Friedrich Milde (oboe), Grete Niggemann (viol), Siegfried Petrenz (harpsichord) (1977) Mitschnitt SDR

References

1927 births
2016 deaths
People from Crailsheim
20th-century classical composers
20th-century German painters
21st-century German painters
German women painters
German women classical composers
People from the Free People's State of Württemberg
20th-century German women artists
21st-century German women artists
20th-century German composers
Women classical composers
German classical composers
20th-century women composers